The Miracle of Life is a 1926 American silent drama film directed by Stanner E.V. Taylor and starring Percy Marmont, Mae Busch, and Nita Naldi.

Cast
 Percy Marmont as Blair Howell
 Mae Busch as Janet Howell
 Nita Naldi as Helen

References

Bibliography
 Donald W. McCaffrey & Christopher P. Jacobs. Guide to the Silent Years of American Cinema. Greenwood Publishing, 1999.

External links

 

1926 films
1926 drama films
1920s English-language films
American silent feature films
Silent American drama films
American black-and-white films
Films directed by Stanner E.V. Taylor
Associated Exhibitors films
1920s American films